Axial Age (also Axis Age, from the German ) is a term coined by the German philosopher Karl Jaspers. It refers to broad changes in religious and philosophical thought that occurred in a variety of locations from about the 8th to the 3rd century BC.

According to Jaspers, during this period, universalizing modes of thought appeared in Persia, India, China, the Levant, and the Greco-Roman world, in a striking parallel development, without any obvious admixture between these disparate cultures. Jaspers identified key thinkers from this age who had a profound influence on future philosophies and religions, and identified characteristics common to each area from which those thinkers emerged. 

The historical validity of the Axial Age is disputed. Some criticisms of Jasper's include the lack of a demonstrable common denominator between the intellectual developments that are supposed to have developed in unison across ancient Greece, Israel, India, and China; lack of any radical discontinuity with "preaxial" and "postaxial" periods; and exclusion of pivotal figures that do not fit the definition (for example, Jesus, Muhammad, and Akhenaten). Despite these criticisms, the Axial Age continues to be an influential idea, with many scholars accepting that profound changes in religious and philosophical discourse did indeed take place but disagreeing as to the underlying reasons. To quote Robert Bellah and Hans Joas, "The notion that in significant parts of Eurasia the middle centuries of the first millennium BC mark a significant transition in human cultural history, and that this period can be referred to as the Axial Age, has become widely, but not universally, accepted."

Origin of the idea of Axial Age
Jaspers introduced the concept of an Axial Age in his book  (The Origin and Goal of History), published in 1949. The simultaneous appearance of thinkers and philosophers in different areas of the world had been remarked by numerous authors since the 18th century, notably by the French Indologist Abraham Hyacinthe Anquetil-Duperron. Jaspers explicitly cited some of these authors, including Victor von Strauß (1859) and Ernst von Lasaulx (1870). He was unaware of the first fully nuanced theory from 1873 by John Stuart Stuart-Glennie, forgotten by Jaspers' time, and which Stuart-Glennie termed "the moral revolution". Stuart-Glennie and Jaspers both claimed that the Axial Age should be viewed as an objective empirical fact of history, independently of religious considerations. Jaspers argued that during the Axial Age, "the spiritual foundations of humanity were laid simultaneously and independently in China, India, Persia, Judea, and Greece. And these are the foundations upon which humanity still subsists today."

Jaspers identified a number of key thinkers as having had a profound influence on future philosophies and religions, and identified characteristics common to each area from which those thinkers emerged. Jaspers held up this age as unique and one to which the rest of the history of human thought might be compared.

Characteristics
Jaspers presented his first outline of the Axial age by a series of examples:

Jaspers described the Axial Age as "an interregnum between two ages of great empire, a pause for liberty, a deep breath bringing the most lucid consciousness". It has also been suggested that the Axial Age was a historically liminal period, when old certainties had lost their validity and new ones were still not ready.

Jaspers had a particular interest in the similarities in circumstance and thought of its figures. Similarities included an engagement in the quest for  human meaning and the rise of a new élite class of religious leaders and thinkers in China, India and the Mediterranean.

Individual thinkers each laid  spiritual foundations within a framework of a changing social environment. Jaspers argues that the characteristics appeared under similar political circumstances: China, India, the Middle East and the Occident each comprised multiple small states engaged in internal and external struggles.
The three regions all gave birth to, and then institutionalized, a tradition of travelling scholars,
who roamed from city to city to exchange ideas. After the Spring and Autumn period (8th to 5th centuries BCE) and the Warring States period (5th to 3rd centuries BCE), Taoism and Confucianism emerged in China. In other regions, the scholars largely developed extant religious traditions; in India, Hinduism, Buddhism, and Jainism; in Persia, Zoroastrianism; in the Levant, Judaism; and in Greece, Sophism and other classical philosophies.

Many of the cultures of the axial age have been considered second-generation societies because they developed on the basis of societies which preceded them.

Thinkers and movements
In China, the Hundred Schools of Thought (c. 6th century BCE) were in contention and Confucianism and Taoism arose during this era, and in this area it remains a profound influence on social and religious life.

Zoroastrianism, another of Jaspers' examples, is one of the first monotheistic religions. William W. Malandra and R. C. Zaehner, suggest that Zoroaster may indeed have been an early contemporary of Cyrus the Great living around 550 BCE. Mary Boyce and other leading scholars who once supported much earlier dates for Zarathustra/Zoroaster have recently changed their position on the time when he likely lived, so that there is an emerging consensus regarding him as a contemporary or near-contemporary of Cyrus the Great.

Jainism propagated the religion of sramanas (previous Tirthankaras) and influenced Indian philosophy by propounding the principles of ahimsa (non-violence), karma, samsara, and asceticism. Mahavira (24th Tirthankara in the 5th century BCE), known as a fordmaker of Jainism and a contemporary with the Buddha, lived during this age.

Buddhism, also of the sramana tradition of India, was another of the world's most influential philosophies, founded by Siddhartha Gautama, or the Buddha, who lived c. 5th century BCE; its spread was aided by Ashoka, who lived late in the period.

Jaspers' axial shifts included the rise of Platonism (c. 4th century BCE) and Neoplatonism (3rd century AD), which would later become a major influence on the Western world through both Christianity and secular thought throughout the Middle Ages and into the Renaissance.

Reception
In addition to Jaspers, the philosopher Eric Voegelin referred to this age as The Great Leap of Being, constituting a new spiritual awakening and a shift of perception from societal to individual values. Thinkers and teachers like the Buddha, Pythagoras, Heraclitus, Parmenides, and Anaxagoras contributed to such awakenings which Plato would later call anamnesis, or a remembering of things forgotten.

David Christian notes that the first "universal religions" appeared in the age of the first universal empires and of the first all-encompassing trading networks.  This conclusion overlooks the fact that Venus statues, for example, are found across much of Eurasia, and date back many millennia before the first empires.  What some regard as the emergence of religion is more likely the emergence of institutionalized and codified religion.

Anthropologist David Graeber has pointed out that "the core period of Jasper's Axial age ... corresponds almost exactly to the period in which coinage was invented. What's more, the three parts of the world where coins were first invented were also the very parts of the world where those sages lived; in fact, they became the epicenters of Axial Age religious and philosophical creativity." Drawing on the work of classicist Richard Seaford and literary theorist Marc Shell on the relation between coinage and early Greek thought, Graeber argues that an understanding of the rise of markets is necessary to grasp the context in which the religious and philosophical insights of the Axial age arose. The ultimate effect of the introduction of coinage was, he argues, an "ideal division of spheres of human activity that endures to this day: on the one hand the market, on the other, religion".

German sociologist Max Weber played an important role in Jaspers' thinking. Shmuel Eisenstadt argues in the introduction to The Origins and Diversity of Axial Age Civilizations that Weber's work in his The Religion of China: Confucianism and Taoism, The Religion of India: The Sociology of Hinduism and Buddhism and Ancient Judaism provided a background for the importance of the period, and notes parallels with Eric Voegelin's Order and History. Wider acknowledgement of Jaspers' work came after it was presented at a conference and published in Daedalus in 1975, and Jaspers' suggestion that the period was uniquely transformative generated important discussion among other scholars, such as Johann Arnason. In literature, Gore Vidal in his novel Creation covers much of this Axial Age through the fictional perspective of a Persian adventurer.

Shmuel Eisenstadt analyses economic circumstances relating to the coming of the Axial Age in Greece.

Religious historian Karen Armstrong explored the period in her book The Great Transformation, and the theory has been the focus of numerous academic conferences.

Usage of the term has expanded beyond Jaspers' original formulation. Yves Lambert argues that the Enlightenment was a Second Axial Age, including thinkers such as Isaac Newton and Albert Einstein, wherein relationships between religion, secularism, and traditional thought are changing.

The validity of the concept has been called into question.

In 2006 Diarmaid MacCulloch called the Jaspers thesis "a baggy monster, which tries to bundle up all sorts of diversities over four very different civilisations, only two of which had much contact with each other during the six centuries that (after adjustments) he eventually singled out, between 800 and 200 BCE".

In 2013, another comprehensive critique appears in Iain Provan's book Convenient Myths: The Axial Age, Dark Green Religion, and the World That Never Was.

In 2018, contrary to Suzuki and Provan, and similar to Whitaker, Stephen Sanderson published another book dealing somewhat with the axial age and its religious contributions, arguing that religions and religious change in general are essentially biosocial adaptations to changing environments.

See also
 Ancient philosophy

References

Footnotes

Bibliography

 .  A semi-historic description of the events and milieu of the Axial Age.
 .
 .
 .
 Eisenstadt, S. N. (Ed.). (1986). The Origins and Diversity of Axial Age Civilizations. SUNY Press. 
 Hans Joas  and  Robert N. Bellah (Eds), (2012), The Axial Age and Its Consequences, Belknap Press, 
Halton, Eugene (2014), From the Axial Age to the Moral Revolution: John Stuart-Glennie, Karl Jaspers, and a New Understanding of the Idea, New York: Palgrave Macmillan. 
 .

Further reading
 .
 .
 .
 Yves Lambert (1999). "Religion in Modernity as a New Axial Age: Secularization or New Religious Forms?". Oxford University Press: Sociology of Religion Vol. 60 No. 3. pp. 303–333. A general model of analysis of the relations between religion and modernity, where modernity is conceived as a new axial age.
 Rodney Stark (2007). Discovering God: A New Look at the Origins of the Great Religions. NY: HarperOne.
 Gore Vidal (1981). Creation. NY: Random House. A novel narrated by the fictional grandson of Zoroaster in 445 BCE, describing encounters with the central figures of the Axial Age during his travels.
 Mark D. Whitaker (2009). Ecological Revolution: The Political Origins of Environmental Degradation and the Environmental Origins of Axial Religions; China, Japan, Europe Lambert. Dr. Whitaker's research received a grant award from the U.S. National Science Foundation in Association with the American Sociological Association.

External links
 The Axial Age and Its Consequences, a 2008 conference in Erfurt, DE.

Historical eras
Ancient philosophy
Religion in ancient history
Iron Age